MiGFlug GmbH is a Zurich, Switzerland-based Aviation and Space Adventure company specialized in fighter jet flights. The company was founded in 2004 by current CEO Philipp Schaer and Flavio Kaufmann. , offerings include jet trainer flights, supersonic flights, edge of space flights, zero gravity flights and suborbital space flights.

Company 
Philipp Schaer is the current CEO of MiGFlug. He co-founded the company in 2004, with another student at the University of Zurich. The company is headquartered in Zurich, Switzerland, and registered in the commercial register of Lucerne. MiGFlug's main business is offering flights in military fighter jets for civilians, including supersonic flights. It started with jet flights from Ramenskoye Airport, Russia. MiGFlug has been shown on Lonely Planet’s Year of Adventures with Ben Fogle, and broadcast on BBC. A number of notable passengers have flown in one of the company's fighter jets, including Anthony Bourdain, Zoltán Báthory, Joel Kinnaman, Miss India 2010 Manasvi Mamgai, TyDi, Josh Cartu, "Evil" Jared Hasselhoff, Alan Walker, Jake Paul, Klaas Heufer-Umlauf, Joko Winterscheidt, Jan Marsalek, Roberto Chevalier and Pauline Nordin.

Several of MiGFlug's jets and pilots have appeared in movies, TV, and advertisements. For example, an L-39 appeared in the 1997 James Bond film Tomorrow Never Dies in the opening scene. MiGFlug has produced several Galileo episodes for ProSieben, as well as a zero gravity flight for Joko gegen Klaas. Porsche, Mercedes-Benz Diesel, OnePlus, IGN, and Swiss diary company Emmi AG produced advertisements or advertorials with MiGFlug.

MiGFlug's subsidiary GoAviator specializes in vintage flights, for example in warbirds and biplanes. MiGFlug also has a popular blog, covering aviation topics, with a focus on military aviation.

Since 2015, MiGFlug has offered formation jet flights with up to six passengers flying at the same time in close formation in an L-39.

In some locations MiGFlug also offers flights to customers in wheelchairs, who enter the L-39 jets with the help of a forklift.

Aircraft flown

Aircraft flown in the past 
Jets offered from Ramenskoye Airbase near Moscow in Russia from 2004-2006 included MiG-23, MiG-25, MiG-29 and the Su-27. Through a cooperation with Thunder City in Cape Town, South Africa, MiGFlug offered English Electric Lightning and Blackburn Buccaneer flights. MiGFlug also organized T-38 supersonic flights in the US for Galileo/ProSieben. From 2006-2009, MiGflug offered Mikoyan MiG-31 Foxhound flights and from 2006-2017 Mikoyan MiG-29 Fulcrum flights from Sokol Airbase, in Nizhny Novgorod.

Spacecraft and zero gravity 
Weightless flight offers include the Ilyushin Il-76 from Star City (Zvyozdny gorodok) near Moscow and a Boeing 727 in the United States, through a cooperation agreement with the Zero Gravity Corporation. MiGFlug also had an arrangement to offer future sub-orbital spaceflights in the XCOR Lynx; Xcor filed for Chapter 7 bankruptcy in 2017.

Planned future flights 
According to monthly German aerobatic magazine FliegerRevue, MiGFlug plans to offer stratosphere flights, or so-called "Edge of Space" flights, in both MiG-21 and MiG-23 aircraft to replace the MiG-29, which has no longer been available since late 2017.

Cancellation of Russian flight offers due to War in Ukraine 
After the 2022 Russian invasion of Ukraine, MiGFlug announced to stop all remaining offers in Russia and spend any recent profits made by Russian flights to help Ukraine.

References 

Companies based in Zürich
Companies established in 2004
Aerospace companies
Privately held companies of Switzerland